Blepharomastix biannulalis is a moth in the family Crambidae. It was described by George Hampson in 1907. It is found in Brazil.

References

Moths described in 1907
Blepharomastix